Mirko Felicetti  (born 15 July 1992) is an Italian snowboarder.
 
He competed in the 2015 and 2017 FIS Snowboard World Championships, and in the 2018 Winter Olympics, in parallel giant slalom.

References

External links

1992 births
Living people
Italian male snowboarders
Olympic snowboarders of Italy
Snowboarders at the 2018 Winter Olympics
Snowboarders at the 2022 Winter Olympics
21st-century Italian people